The Social Security Agency is a government agency in Northern Ireland. It is a department within the Department for Communities (DfC), dealing with social security.

Services
The SSA deal with the benefits given to people who may be unemployed, supporting children under 16, unemployed with medical conditions etc. Their main goals are to:

 Assess and pay social security benefits accurately and securely
 Give advice and information about these benefits
 Handle reviews and appeals
 Prevent and detect benefit fraud, prosecute offenders and recover any benefit which has been paid incorrectly
 Recover benefit which has been paid in compensation cases
 Assess people’s financial circumstances if they are applying for legal aid

Location

The SSA's headquarters are located on the Stormont estate, close to Parliament Buildings. Their service extends to all of Northern Ireland, but also to 3 districts within London through back-office services on behalf of the Department for Work and Pensions.

See also
List of Government departments and agencies in Northern Ireland

External links
SSA Homepage
Department for Social Development

Northern Ireland Executive
Social security in the United Kingdom